Press is a six-part British television drama series first aired on BBC One on 6 September 2018. Created and written by Mike Bartlett,  the series depicts two rival British newspapers and the lives of their senior employees. It was broadcast in the United States in October 2019 and December 2020 – January 2021.

The series was cancelled after one series. However, it was remade in India as The Broken News in 2022.

Cast
Charlotte Riley as Holly Evans, news editor of The Herald
Ben Chaplin as Duncan Allen, editor of The Post
Priyanga Burford as Amina Chaudury, editor of The Herald
Paapa Essiedu as Ed Washburn, reporter at The Post
Al Weaver as James Edwards, investigative reporter at The Herald
Ellie Kendrick as Leona Manning-Lynd, reporter at The Herald
Genevieve Barr as Charlotte Evans, Features Editor at The Herald
Brendan Cowell as Peter Langly, deputy editor of The Herald
Shane Zaza as Raz Kane, news editor of The Post
Susannah Wise as Wendy Bolt, a columnist 
David Suchet as George Emmerson, chairman and CEO of Worldwide News, owners of The Post
Elliot Levey as Matthew Harper, the Prime Minister
Dominic Rowan as Joshua West, business tycoon
Allison McKenzie as Kelly, journalist at The Post

Episodes
{{Episode table |background=#000000 |overall= |title= |titleR= |director= |directorR= |writer= |writerR= |airdate= |airdateR= |viewers=  |country=U.K. |episodes=
{{Episode list
 |EpisodeNumber = 1
 |Title = Death Knock
 |DirectedBy = Tom Vaughan
 |WrittenBy = Mike Bartlett
 |OriginalAirDate = 
 |Viewers = 4.39
 |ShortSummary = Herald reporter Holly Evans (Charlotte Riley) is forced to turn to the enemy – Post editor Duncan Allen (Ben Chaplin) – to further her investigation into a hit-and-run. New to The Post, Oxford graduate Ed Washburn (Paapa Essiedu) is tasked with his first "death knock", reporting on a closeted footballer's suicide. Investigative reporter James Edwards (Al Weaver) pursues an MI5 lead, but finds himself blocked by The Herald'''s weary editor Amina (Priyanga Burford).
 |LineColor = 000
}}

}}

 Reception 
The review aggregator, Rotten Tomatoes, gave Press a rating of 95%. Sophie Gilbert of The Atlantic called it "fascinating" and "periodically clunky."

Journalists were not impressed with the show, Digital Spy calling it "less realistic than Star Trek." Sean O'Grady of The Independent characterised it as "too cliché-ridden, its characters two-dimensional stereotypes, floating around like dead fish in a tank." The Guardian's Sam Wollaston gave it three stars, but called its picture of the industry "20 years out of date."

Indian adaptation
BBC Studios India produced a Hindi language remake, written by Bartlett and Sambit Mishra, for streaming service ZEE5. It stars Jaideep Ahlawat, Sonali Bendre, Shriya Pilgaonkar, Indraneil Sengupta, Taaruk Raina, Aakash Khurana and Kiran Kumar. The Broken News'' began streaming on 10 June 2022.

References

External links
 
 
 

2018 British television series debuts
2018 British television series endings
2010s British drama television series
2010s British television miniseries
BBC television dramas
BBC television miniseries
English-language television shows
Television series by BBC Studios
Television shows set in England
Television shows scored by Natalie Holt